Nightlife is the third solo studio album from singer-songwriter Karl Wolf. It was released initially to the Japanese market. The album was released in Canada on November 17, 2009. The first single "Yalla Habibi" was released on iTunes October 28, 2009 and reached #24 on the Canadian Hot 100. The second single is the remix of "Hurting" featuring Sway, which peaked at #55 on the same chart. The third single is the 2009 remix of Africa.

Track listing
Yalla Habibi (feat. Rime Salmi and Kaz Money) (Produced by I-Notchz)
Maniac Maniac (feat. Culture)
80's Baby (Produced by Billboard)
You Forgot About Me (feat. Imposs) (Produced by Billboard)
Numb (Produced by I-Notchz)
Nightlife (Produced by Capo Decina)
Hurting (feat. Sway) (Produced by Danny Neville & Q of Underground Procedures)
Love
No Way Nobody (feat. Loon) (Produced by Danny Neville & Q of Underground Procedures)
Gone With The Wind
I'll Wait
Best Friend
Jealous
My Ethnicity
Africa '09 (Bonus Track)
Carrera (2009) (Bonus Track)
Yalla Habibi (Allez Cheri) (Bonus Track) (Produced by I-Notchz)

Ratings
The Uniter rated it at 2 stars out of 5

References

2009 albums
Karl Wolf albums